John Estes (born March 25, 1987) is a former center and guard. He graduated from the University of Hawaii at Manoa with a degree in Communications in December 2009.

College career
At Hawaii, Estes was a three-time All-Western Athletic Conference performer. Estes also set the NCAA record for consecutive games started (54) and games played (54) in 2009.

Estes was on the Rimington Award watch list in 2007, 2008, and 2009.  In his senior year campaign of 2009 he was one of 3 finalists for the award.

In 2019, he was named to the Western Athletic Conference's All-Decade Team for the 2000s.

Professional career
Estes was signed as an undrafted free agent following the 2010 NFL Draft by the Jacksonville Jaguars.

Estes spent the 2012 season on injured reserve. He became a free agent in March 2013.

He signed with the Arizona Cardinals on March 4, 2014. He was released by the team on May 12. He re-signed with the Cardinals on June 9 and was released on August 30, 2014.
	
Estes signed with the Calgary Stampeders as a free agent on July 21, 2015.

Coaching career
Estes was a graduate assistant at Hawaii on Nick Rolovich's inaugural staff in 2016. He remained on the staff for the 2017 season, serving as the team's de facto offensive line coach after Chris Naeole resigned midway through the season.

In 2019, Estes joined the Houston Roughnecks of the XFL as offensive line coach.

Football relatives
Estes comes from a long line of football players in his family both collegiately and professionally: 
 His grandfather Pat Hiram and uncle Roy Hiram were All-American running backs at San Jose State University
 His brother Patrick Estes was a defensive tackle at the University of Nevada in 2002
 His uncle was All-Pro offensive tackle Rocky Freitas of the Detroit Lions
 His cousins Makai Freitas was on the Arizona Wildcats in 2001, Makoa Freitas was on the Arizona Wildcats 2003 and the Indianapolis Colts, Kahai 2008 and Kainoa LaCount 2010 at the University of Hawaii, and Mana Greig University of Oregon 2014.

References

External links
Hawaii Warriors bio

1987 births
Living people
Players of American football from Stockton, California
American football centers
Canadian football centres
American players of Canadian football
Hawaii Rainbow Warriors football players
Jacksonville Jaguars players
Arizona Cardinals players
Calgary Stampeders players
Hawaii Rainbow Warriors football coaches
Houston Roughnecks coaches
Players of Canadian football from Stockton, California